Nova Vas nad Dragonjo is a village to the northeast above Dragonja in the Municipality of Piran in the Littoral region of Slovenia.

The local church is dedicated to Our Lady of the Rosary.

References

External links

Nova Vas nad Dragonjo on Geopedia

Populated places in the Municipality of Piran